The Mezcalera Ocean is an inferred ancient ocean preserved in rocks in western Mexico. The Mezcalera oceanic plate was likely subducted and consumed into the mantle allowing the Guerrero Terrane to be accreted to western Mexico in the Early Cretaceous. 

Speculative reconstructions suggest that Mezcalera plate experienced slab rollback in the east along the Mexican Craton and simultaneously subducted in the west beneath the Guerrero Terrane.

See also
 List of ancient oceans

References

Historical oceans
Oceanography
Jurassic Mexico